Pakpattan Canal is an irrigation canal in central Punjab, Pakistan. The canal is extracted from Sulemanki Headworks.

The canal is named after Pakistani city of Pakpattan.

Salient Features

Upper Pakpattan Canal 

Design discharge : 6594 cusecs ( of taking from Suleimanki Headworks)

Lower Pakpattan Canal 

Design Discharge : 1585 cusecs (of taking from SMB Link)

Administrative Setup
Pakpattan Canal is administrated by 
 Multan Irrigation Zone- Multan
Nili Bar Circle- Sahiwal
Suleimanki Division-Suleimanki
Eastern Bar Division-Pakpattan
Western Bar Division- Thingi

Tributary Canals
Length of canal  is measured in canal miles. Pakpattan Canal has 66 branch canals, 691 distributaries and 440 minors and sub-minors.

Power Plant setup
There is a plan to set a power plant on this canal which will provide 2.82 MW. 14 km transmission will cost 82 million PKRs. The electricity will be provided to MEPCO via 132 kv Pakpattan power station.

References

Canals in Pakistan
Buildings and structures in Punjab, Pakistan